Dig Deeper is the debut studio album by Australian acid jazz band D.I.G. and was released in March 1994. The album peaked at number 6 on the ARIA charts and was certified gold.

At the ARIA Music Awards of 1995, the album was nominated for the Breakthrough Artist - Album.

Track listing
 Disc 1
 "Two Way Dreamtime" - 6:05
 "Medium Rare" (Interlude) - 1:35
 "The Favourite" - 5:50
 "D.N.A." (Interlude) - 1:24
 "Pythonicity" - 5:17
 "Shelflife" - 5:01
 "Hip Replacement" - 5:53
 "Suffer the Children" (Interlude) - 1:40
 "Gil"	- 6:57
 "The DIG Theme" - 5:40
 "The Den" (Interlude)	- 0:25
 "Terrified from Dizzy Heights" - 7:39
 "Re-Invent Yourself" (Re-Mix)	- 5:23
 "Inner Blue Funk" - 6:14

 Disc 2 (Bonus Disc) DIG Live
 "Re-Invent Yourself" - 8:45
 "The Favourite" - 11:21
 "Same as B3" - 6:03

 Disc 2 recorded live at The Basement in Sydney on 2 December 1993

Charts

Weekly charts

Year-end charts

Certification

Release history

References

1994 debut albums
Directions in Groove albums